Viorel Kraus (born 5 March 1940) is a former professional footballer who played as a forward for clubs in Romania and Turkey.

Career
Kraus started playing football for FC Rapid București, winning the Romanian league during his last season with the club. In 1967, he joined FC Argeş Piteşti and would score a goal in the 1967–68 Inter-Cities Fairs Cup during his two years in Piteşti.

Kraus next moved to Turkey to join Altay S.K. He made 24 appearances in the Süper Lig during the 1969–70 season. He returned to Romania to finish his career with FC Sportul Studențesc București.

After retiring from playing football, Kraus became an assistant manager for Sportul Studențesc. He would be appointed manager of Rapid București on three occasions, and also managed abroad in Greece and Saudi Arabia.

References

External links
 Profile at Rapidfans.ro
 

1940 births
Living people
Romanian footballers
Association football forwards
FC Rapid București players
FC Argeș Pitești players
FC Sportul Studențesc București players
Altay S.K. footballers
Romanian football managers
FC Rapid București managers
FC Bihor Oradea managers
Romanian expatriate footballers
Romanian expatriate football managers
Romanian expatriate sportspeople in Turkey
Expatriate footballers in Turkey
Romanian expatriate sportspeople in Greece
Expatriate football managers in Greece
Romanian expatriate sportspeople in Saudi Arabia
Expatriate football managers in Saudi Arabia
Sportspeople from Alba Iulia
FC Rapid București assistant managers